Joaquim Torlades O'Neill (Lisbon, Mercês, 16 May 1826 - ?), was a son of the previous head José Maria O'Neill, the titular head of the Clanaboy O'Neill dynasty, whose family has been in Portugal since the 18th century, and wife Ludovina de Jesus Alves Solano.

Career
He was a trader, Vice-Consul of France, Denmark and the United States of America in Setúbal, etc.

Marriage and issue
He married in Lisbon, Encarnação, on 25 February 1854 to his first cousin Maria Carolina Caffary (or Caffre) (Lisbon, São Paulo, 4 August 1823 - ?), daughter of Patrício João Caffary (or Caffre) and wife Maria Salomé O'Neill, and had two sons: 
 João Pedro Torlades O'Neill (Palmela - ?)
 Maria Carolina Caffary O'Neill (Palmela, São Pedro, 22 September 1858 - Setúbal, 26 July 1943), married her cousin Henrique O'Neill de Groot Pombo (Setúbal, São Sebastião, 4 April 1854 - ?), son of José de Groot Pombo, of Dutch descent, and wife Paulina Pinto da Maia O'Neill, without issue

Relationship and issue
He also had five bastard sons by Prudência Gomes: 
 Constantino O'Neill, married to Emília Lapido, and had issue, now extinct
 Cristóvão O'Neill, married to Maria da Trindade, and had issue
 Leopoldo O'Neill, unmarried and without issue
 Afonso-Henriques O'Neill, married to Paulina Angriam, might have had issue
 Jaime O'Neill, married to Beatriz ..., and had issue

See also
 Irish nobility
 Irish kings
 Irish royal families
 O'Neill (surname)
 Uí Néill, the Irish Dynasty
 Ó Neill Dynasty Today
 O'Neill of Clannaboy

References

External links
 O'Neill Genealogy

1826 births
Portuguese diplomats
Portuguese nobility
Portuguese people of Irish descent
Connachta
O'Neill dynasty
Year of death unknown
Date of death unknown
19th-century Portuguese people
People from Lisbon